Legislative elections were held in Russia on 19 December 1999 to elect the 450 seats in the State Duma, the lower house of the Federal Assembly. Like in the previous elections in 1995, the electoral system resulted in many parties competing for the proportional seats and a significant number of independent deputies elected.

Electoral system
According to the 1993 electoral law, 225 members of the house were allocated proportionally, using statewide party lists, while other 225 members were elected in single-member constituencies, using first past the post system.

To secure a place on the ballot, parties had to have registered with the Russian Ministry of Justice one year before the election (instead of six months in previous elections). As an alternative to gathering 200,000 signatures, they had the option of paying a deposit of just over two million roubles, returnable if the party won at least 3.0 percent of the list vote. In order to increase proportionality, the law provided that if parties reaching the five per cent threshold got in total 50 per cent or less of the vote, parties with at least 3.0 per cent of the vote would also win seats by declining numbers of votes up to the point at which the total share of vote exceeded 50 per cent. However, if after this procedure the parties winning seats still had less than 50 per cent of the vote, the election was to be deemed invalid. In the single-member district ballots, if votes cast against all exceeded the votes of each candidate, a repeat election had to be held within four months. As a result, repeat elections had to be held in eight districts. Finally, as an alternative to gathering signatures in support of their nomination, single-member district candidates were also given the option of paying a deposit of 83,490 roubles, returnable if she won at least 5.0 percent of the district vote.

Campaign
The early election campaign saw the initial surge in popularity of Fatherland-All Russia bloc, led by the Moscow mayor Yuri Luzhkov and the former Prime Minister Yevgeny Primakov, which tried to capitalize upon the perceived incapacity of President Boris Yeltsin and the weakness of his administration. The tide had turned on 9 August 1999 when Yeltsin designated Vladimir Putin as Prime Minister and his eventual successor. On 24 November, Putin announced that "as a citizen" he will support the recently formed pro-government bloc Interregional Movement "Unity", headed by General Sergei Shoigu, a member of all Russian governments since 1994.

Opinion polls

Results

Further reading
Hesli, Vicki L. & William M. Reisinger (2003). The 1999–2000 Elections in Russia: Their Impact and Legacy. Cambridge: Cambridge University Press. 
reviewed by Luke March in: Slavic Review 63.4 (Winter 2004), 897–898.
Russian general elections
Final report on the parliamentary elections in the Russian Federation, 19 December 1999, Organization for Security and Co-operation in Europe, 13 February 2000.
Ad hoc Committee to observe the parliamentary elections in Russia (19 December 1999), PACE Report. 24 January 2000.

Notes

References

Legislative elections in Russia
Legislative
Legislative
Russia
Russia
3rd State Duma of the Russian Federation